Ford Richardson Bryan (May 13, 1912 – May 14, 2004) was a member of the Ford family of Dearborn, who provided authentic historical information about the Ford family based almost entirely the Ford Archives of Henry Ford Museum and associated Greenfield Village.

Born in Crystal, Michigan, Bryan graduated from Eastern Michigan University in 1934; he then received his master's degree from University of Michigan in 1941. From family bibles, family legend, correspondence, and the historical archives of Dearborn, he traced the family history from England to Ireland, then to America, and in 1832 to the wilderness of the Michigan Territory, much of which was included in his book The Fords of Dearborn includes genealogical tables and more than 125 illustrations depicting family members, their farms, homes, and their relationships. Bryan joined Ford Motor Company as a spectrochemical analyst following World War II. Over the course of thirty-three years, he would move on to the Ford Scientific Laboratory, publishing more than seventy technical papers on optical spectroscopy. Following his retirement from Ford, he became a volunteer at the Henry Ford Museum & Greenfield Village. His yen for writing led him to the Ford Archives, where he found a gold mine of material about his own family and about his favorite subject, Henry Ford.

Works
Bryan wrote many books about Henry Ford including:
 Rouge: Pictured in Its Prime
 Friends, Families & Forays
 Clara: Mrs. Henry Ford
 Beyond the Model T: The Other Ventures of Henry Ford
 Henry's Attic: Some Fascinating Gifts to Henry Ford and His Museum
 Henry's Lieutenants

Notes

1912 births
2004 deaths
People from Montcalm County, Michigan
Eastern Michigan University alumni
University of Michigan alumni
Writers from Michigan
20th-century American chemists
Henry Ford family